40 Arietis is a probable binary star system in the northern constellation of Aries. 40 Arietis is the Flamsteed designation. Their combined apparent magnitude is 5.82, putting the system near the limit of naked eye visibility. At that distance, its brightness is diminished by 0.21 in magnitude from extinction caused by interstellar gas and dust.

The visible component is an evolved giant star with a stellar classification of K1 III. It is a suspected variable star of unknown type, and is around 2.6 billion years old with 1.6 times the mass of the Sun. With the supply of hydrogen at its core exhausted, the star has expanded to 20 times the Sun's radius. It is radiating 128 times the luminosity of the Sun from its swollen photosphere at an effective temperature of 4,473 K.

References

External links
 HR 828
 Image 40 Arietis

K-type giants
Spectroscopic binaries
Suspected variables
Aries (constellation)
Durchmusterung objects
Arietis, 40
017459
013108
0828